Oftobruy (also: Aptyuray) is a village in Sughd Region, northern Tajikistan. It is part of the jamoat Navgilem in the city of Isfara.

Notes

References

Populated places in Sughd Region